Dalma is a rural locality in the Rockhampton Region, Queensland, Australia.

History 
Dalma Provisional School opened on 5 March 1889 and closed on 1893.

Dalma Road Provisional School opened on 25 February 1901. On 1 January 1909 it became Dalma Road State School. It closed in 1934.

Dalma Scrub Provisional School opened in May 1920. In 1926 it became Dalma Scrub State School. In 1947 it was renamed Dalma State School. It was "mothballed" on 30 January 2006 and closed on 31 December 2006. It was at 5 Shannen Road. 

Education 
There are no schools in Dalma. The nearest government primary schools are Ridgelands State School in neighbouring Ridgelands to the north and Stanwell State School in neighbouring Stanwell to the south. The nearest government secondary school is Rockhampton State High School in Wandal, Rockhampton.

References 

Suburbs of Rockhampton Region
Localities in Queensland